Hombre Tenías que Ser  (You Had To Be A Man) is a Mexican telenovela produced by Azteca in 2013. It is a remake of Colombian telenovela, Hombres. On September 23, 2013, Azteca started broadcasting Hombre Tenías que Ser weeknights at 9:30pm, replacing Vivir a destiempo. The last episode was broadcast on February 14, 2014, with Avenida Brasil replacing it the following week.

Episodes

References

Lists of Mexican television series episodes